Ash Amin,  (born 31 October 1955) is a British academic known for his writing on urban and regional development, contemporary cultural change, progressive politics, and the collaborative economy. He holds the 1931 chair at the Department of Geography, University of Cambridge. Since September 2015 he has held the post of foreign secretary of the British Academy.

Early life
Amin was born in Kampala, Uganda. and lived in the South Asian community of Kenya until the age of 16, when he emigrated with his family to settle in Britain. He finished his schooling at Stratford Grammar School in London. 
He graduated from the University of Reading in 1979 with a degree in Italian Studies and then gained a PhD in geography from Reading in 1986.

Career
He is a geographer, interested in the geographies of contemporary social, political and economic change and their effects on situated life, autonomy and identity. His research has been based mainly in Europe, but is increasingly focusing on informal settlements in the developing world. His career started at Newcastle University in 1982. He was a Research Fellow and Research Associate at the Centre for Urban and Regional Development Studies and also a Lecturer and later a Professor in the Department of Geography. In 2005 he left Newcastle for Durham University, where he was head of the geography department and the founding Executive Director of the Institute of Advanced Study. In 2011 was appointed as 1931 Chair in Geography at University of Cambridge and became a professorial Fellow of Christ's College.

Books
Amin, A. and Thrift, N. 2016. Seeing Like a City. Cambridge: Polity Press.
Amin, A. and Thrift, N., 2013. Arts of the Political: New Openings for the Left, Duke University Press
Amin, A., 2012. Land of Strangers, Polity Press. v. 20, p. 1–8. http://doi.org/10.1080/1070289X.2012.732544
Amin, A. and O'Neill, M. (eds.), 2009. Thinking About Almost Everything, Profile Books
Amin, A. (ed.), 2009. The Social Economy, Zed Books
Amin, A. and Roberts, J. (eds.), 2008. Community, Economic Creativity, and Organization, Oxford University Press. 324pp. doi:10.1093/acprof:oso/9780199545490.001.0001
Amin, A. and Thrift, N. (eds.), 2004. The Blackwell Cultural Economy Reader, Blackwell
Amin, A. and Cohendet, P., 2004. Architectures of Knowledge, Oxford University Press. p. 1–194. doi:10.1093/acprof:oso/9780199253326.001.0001
Amin, A., Massey, D.B. and Thrift, N.J., 2003. Decentering the Nation A Radical Approach to Regional Inequality, Compas. 45pp
Amin, A., Cameron, A. and Hudson, R., 2002. Placing the Social Economy, Routledge. 147pp
Amin, A. and Thrift, N., 2002. Cities: Re-imagining the Urban, Polity Press
Amin, A., Massey, D.B. and Thrift, N.J., 2000. Cities for the Many Not the Few, Policy Press. 48pp
Amin, A. (ed.), 1997. Beyond Market and Hierarchy Interactive Governance and Social Complexity, Edward Elgar Pub. 327pp
Amin, A. (ed.), 1995. Post-Fordism A Reader, Wiley-Blackwell. 448pp
Amin, A. (ed.), 1995. Behind the Myth of European Union Prospects for Cohesion, Routledge. 334pp
Amin, A. and Thrift, N. (eds.), 1994. Globalisation, Institutions and Regional Development in Europe, Oxford University Press
Amin, A. (ed.), 1991. Towards a New Europe? Structural Change in the European Economy, Edward Elgar Pub. 241pp
Amin, A. and Goddard, J.B. (eds.), 1986. Technological Change, Industrial Restructuring and Regional Development, Allen & Unwin

Awards and fellowships
Amin has held fellowships and visiting professorships at a number of universities, including the University of Venice, the University of Naples, University of Copenhagen, Erasmus University Rotterdam, Columbia University, the Federal University of Minas Gerais, Queen Mary College, London, and the University of Uppsala.
He has been held positions on the ESRC Research Priorities Board, the Race Advisory Board of the Joseph Rowntree Foundation, the Council of the European Association of Evolutionary Political Economy, the Pro-Futura Programme of the Swedish Collegium of Advanced Study, the Advanced Grants Panel of the European Research Council, and the Strategic Research Projects Board of the University of Padova.

He has received various awards and membership to prestigious bodies such as:
Life Corresponding member of the Italian Institute of Geographers
Fellow of the World Academy of Art and Science
Royal Geographical Society's Edward Heath Prize in 1998
Academician of the Academy of Learned Societies for the Social Sciences
Fellow of the British Academy

He was appointed Commander of the Order of the British Empire (CBE) in the 2014 New Year Honours for services to social science., and on 30 January 2015 he was awarded an honorary Doctorate from the Faculty of Social Sciences at Uppsala University.

References

1955 births
British geographers
Academics of Durham University
Alumni of the University of Reading
Columbia University alumni
Economic geographers
Fellows of the Academy of Social Sciences
Commanders of the Order of the British Empire
Fellows of the British Academy
Fellows of Christ's College, Cambridge
Living people
People from Kampala
English people of Pakistani descent